Lodovico Bertucci (17th century) was an Italian painter of the Baroque period, specializing in paintings of bambocciate (genre paintings of lower classes, typically painted by Bamboccianti painters) and capricci (imagined vedute). He was born in Modena.

References

17th-century Italian painters
Italian male painters
Painters from Modena
Italian Baroque painters
Year of death unknown
Year of birth unknown